Jeffrey Richards (born March 16, 1947) is an American Broadway theatre producer who has presented both new and revived works for the Broadway stage. His most notable productions include Spring Awakening, August: Osage County, Will Ferrell's You're Welcome America, and Porgy and Bess, as well as numerous premieres by Tracy Letts and David Mamet. He is the recipient of eight Tony Awards.

Richards was nominated for a 2020 Primetime Emmy Award as one of four executive producers of the dramatic film American Son, an adaptation of the 2018 Broadway play of the same title. The film premiered in 2019 at the Toronto International Film Festival, debuted in November 2019 as a television drama, and was nominated for the 2020 Primetime Emmy Award for Outstanding Television Movie.

Early life
Born and raised in New York City,  Richards' mother, Helen Stern Richards, worked as a press agent and manager of many Broadway shows, a long list of which included notable musicals such as West Side Story and Shenandoah.

He attended Wesleyan University and Columbia Journalism School with the intention of becoming a journalist but changed direction, and chose instead to work a public relations job which led to his working on the revival of The Pajama Game (1973).

Career

Richards initially worked as a press agent on and off Broadway for nearly two decades, and in 1995, ventured into theatrical production with the initial Off-Broadway production of The Complete Works of William Shakespeare (Abridged).

In 2000, Richards presented his first production on Broadway with a revival of Gore Vidal's The Best Man. He has since produced over 50 shows on Broadway (many in partnership with producer Jerry Frankel), receiving Tony Awards for his productions of David Mamet's Glengarry Glen Ross (2005); The Pajama Game (2006), Duncan Sheik and Steven Sater's Spring Awakening (2007), Tracy Letts's August: Osage County (2008), Hair (2009), Porgy and Bess (2012), Who's Afraid of Virginia Woolf (2013), and Robert Schenkkan's All The Way (2014). He has been nominated for an additional 14 Tony Awards.

Richards was one of four executive producers who presented the 2019 American dramatic film, American Son, along with Rebecca Gold, and Kerry Washington and Pilar Savone under their Simpson Street banner. The film is an adaptation of the 2018 Broadway play of the same title, written by Christopher Demos-Brown. The movie premiered in 2019 at the Toronto International Film Festival, and made its television debut on Netflix in November 2019 as a "Netflix Television Event". Despite the film's critical reception, it was nominated for the Primetime Emmy Award for Outstanding Television Movie.

Broadway stage

References

External links
 
 

People from New York City
American musical theatre producers
Tony Award winners
1950 births
Living people
American theatre managers and producers
Wesleyan University alumni
Columbia University Graduate School of Journalism alumni